Crackin' Down Hard is a Canadian short comedy film, directed by Mike Clattenburg and released in 2012. The films stars Nicolas Wright as a man trying to relax in isolation in California's Joshua Tree National Park, when another man (Yoursie Thomas) shows up to offer him a prostitute.

The film premiered at the 2012 Toronto International Film Festival, where it received an honorable mention from the Best Canadian Short Film award jury. In December 2012, the film was named to TIFF's annual year-end Canada's Top Ten list for short films.

References

External links

2012 short films
2012 films
Films shot in California
Films directed by Mike Clattenburg
2010s English-language films
Canadian comedy short films
2010s Canadian films